Sparaxis elegans,  is a species of Sparaxis found in South Africa.

References

External links
 
 

elegans